Roswietha Zobelt ( Reichel, born 24 November 1954) is a German rower who competed for East Germany in the 1976 Summer Olympics and in the 1980 Summer Olympics.

Early life
She was born in Rittersgrün in 1954. She grew up around athletics as a summer sport and skiing in winter. In Johanngeorgenstadt, one of the towns of her native Erzgebirgskreis district, she was spotted by rowing coaches who were impressed by her physical appearance; In 1970 she stood 6ft 2in tall, and they convinced Zolbelt to move to near the Beetzsee to take up rowing. She did so that year without ever having sat in a rowing boat before.

Rowing career

Trained by Barbara Müller, she came second in the coxed quad scull at the 1972 East German national championships. A month later, she won gold with the quad scull and the eight at the fourth Spartakiad. At the 1973 East German national championships she won the title in the coxed quad scull. She also competed in the double scull at the nationals alongside her SG Dynamo Potsdam team mate Ursula Wagner and they came second.  The championship title qualified the quad scull team for the 1973 European Rowing Championships where they won gold. For women, the European Championships were the top rowing event to win until 1973 as women's rowing was not introduced to world championships in 1974 or Olympic Games in 1976. For their sporting success, the gold medallists were all given an award in January 1974; Reichel was given a Master of Sport award. At the 1974 national championships, Reichel's quad scull abandoned the race (the sources do not give the background) but they were nominated for the 1974 World Rowing Championships regardless. They were successful and were one of four East German teams to take out inaugural world championship titles for female rowers. In November 1974, the world champions were awarded a Patriotic Order of Merit in bronze (third class); Unger was listed under her married name.

From the 1975 season, she competed under her married name Zobelt after marrying the rower Gunter Zobelt. Sybille Tietze was replaced by Anke Grünberg but the other members of the coxed quad scull team remained. The team won the national championships and then defended their world championship title at the 1975 World Rowing Championships in Nottingham, Great Britain.

In 1976, Zobelt was a crew member of the East German boat which won the gold medal in the quadruple sculls event. Four years later she won her second gold medal with the East German boat in the 1980 quadruple sculls competition.

References

External links
 

1954 births
Living people
East German female rowers
Olympic rowers of East Germany
Rowers at the 1976 Summer Olympics
Rowers at the 1980 Summer Olympics
Olympic gold medalists for East Germany
Olympic medalists in rowing
World Rowing Championships medalists for East Germany
Medalists at the 1980 Summer Olympics
Medalists at the 1976 Summer Olympics
People from Erzgebirgskreis
European Rowing Championships medalists
Sportspeople from Saxony